Ibrahim Makhūs or Ibrahim Makhous or Brahim Makhous and  (1925-2013) was a Syrian Syrian Baathist politician who sat on the Regional Command from 1966 to 1970. He served as foreign minister during Salah Jadid's rule.

After Hafiz al-Asad's seizure of power, Makhous established the Democratic Socialist Arab Ba'ath Party. Makhūs died in 2013, at the age of 88.

Early life
Ibrahim Makhūs was born to a religious and rural Alawite family from the village of Makhūs—the family's namesake—between Latakia and Antioch. His father was a religious shaykh who also worked as a landless cultivator, although he eventually came to own 100 dunams of agricultural land. He served as the arbiter of local disputes and founded a large charitable organization in the Syrian coastal region called "al-Jam'iyyah al-Khayriyyah". It grew to set up a presence in some seventy villages and established one of the first co-ed secondary school in the area.

From a young age, Makhūs worked with his father's association, frequently traveling throughout Latakia's hinterland where he became intimately aware of the peasantry's hardships. While a student, he fought in the 1948 Arab-Israeli War as a volunteer for the Arab forces. 

During the Algerian War of Independence, which began in 1954, he served as a volunteer physician.

References

1925 births
2013 deaths
People from Damascus
Syrian Arab nationalists
Members of the Regional Command of the Arab Socialist Ba'ath Party – Syria Region
Foreign ministers of Syria
Syrian Alawites
Syrian socialists
Muslim socialists